Kazuki Hoshino may refer to:

 Kazuki Hoshino (racing driver)  (born 1977), Japanese racing driver
 Kazuyoshi Hoshino  (born 1947), Japanese racing driver and businessman